India participated in the 1996 Asian Winter Games held in Harbin, China,  from February 4 to February 11. India failed to win any medal in the Games.

Nations at the 1996 Asian Winter Games
1996